The Fanatic is a 2019 American psychological thriller film directed and co-written by Fred Durst. It stars John Travolta as Moose, an autistic man who develops an unhealthy obsession with his favorite actor Hunter Dunbar (Devon Sawa) and stalks him. The film was given a limited theatrical and a VOD release, on August 30, 2019 by Quiver Distribution and Redbox Entertainment, and received mainly negative reviews, with some praise towards Travolta's performance.

Plot 
Moose is a man with autism who works as a street performer on Hollywood Boulevard. He is also an avid film buff, filling his apartment with memorabilia from various movies, including those of cult horror and action film star Hunter Dunbar, with whom he develops an unhealthy obsession. When Moose finally gets an opportunity to meet him and get an autograph for an expensive jacket he purchased at a fan auction, he loses his chance when Dunbar's ex-wife abruptly comes to see him. Moose is friends with a young paparazzi photographer, Leah, who shows Moose an app that publishes the home addresses of famous celebrities, including his hero.

Moose goes to Dunbar's house and tries to give him a letter while also begging him for an autograph. Dunbar confronts Moose, threatening him with violence, and tells him to stay out of his neighborhood. Moose comes back again and climbs a fence, but is scared off by Dunbar's housekeeper. Moose keeps returning and eventually gains entry to the house after accidentally pushing the housekeeper into a stone fountain, inadvertently killing her. Moose is again rejected by Dunbar, who calls Moose a stalker and says he'll kill him if he sees him again.

The experience causes Moose to suffer a complete mental breakdown, and he returns and ties up Dunbar in his bed. When Dunbar wakes up, he sees Moose lying on the floor, appearing to have killed himself, only for Moose to start laughing and get up. Next, Moose dresses up in a Jason Voorhees mask and pretends to stab Dunbar, but his blade is revealed to be a retractable prop knife. A terrified Dunbar pleads for Moose to untie him with promises of autographs and friendship, and he does. Dunbar attacks and nearly kills Moose, shooting off his fingers with a hidden rifle and stabbing him in the eye. Moose starts to cry hysterically and after a seeming change of heart, Dunbar calmly escorts him out of his home.

Moose wanders the streets of Hollywood, sobbing and passing tourists who request to take photos with him, believing his wounds to be a part of a realistic costume, before Leah finds him and takes him to a hospital. Meanwhile, Dunbar is seen being arrested after police, having been informed of his assault on Moose, find the dead housekeeper and mistakenly assume Dunbar killed her.

Cast 
 John Travolta as Moose
 Devon Sawa as Hunter Dunbar
 Ana Golja as Leah
 Jacob Grodnik as Todd
 James Paxton as Slim
Denny Méndez as Amanda

Production 
Pretzel Fang produced the film with VMI Worldwide, Wonderfilm Media, Media Finance Capital, Primal Film LLC and Quiver Distribution funded the film.  In March 2018, principal photography began in Birmingham, Alabama. Redbox Entertainment also funded the film in exchange for release via the Redbox kiosks and streaming services.

Reception

Box office
The Fanatic earned $3,153 from 52 theaters in the U.S. on its opening day, making it a US box-office failure.

Critical response
The website's critical consensus reads: "John Travolta gives it his oddly coiffed all, but The Fanatic rings hollow as an examination of the way fan appreciation can curdle into toxic obsession." On Metacritic, the film has a weighted average score of 18 out of 100, based on 19 critics, indicating "overwhelming dislike".

NPR's Simon Abrams gave the film a negative review, calling it a noticeable downgrade from director Fred Durst's The Education of Charlie Banks and The Longshots, and labeling the work a "miserable psychodrama." Specific elements attracting criticism included the "cliché-filled voiceover narration" and "a bunch of scenes where Travolta zealously overacts". Glenn Kenny of The New York Times also wrote a negative review of the film, arguing that it "delineates the border that separates the merely stale from the genuinely rancid."

In a positive review, Josh Millican of Dread Central called the film "a riveting indie with genuine suspense", and he praised both Travolta's and Sawa's performances.

Accolades
The film was nominated for three Golden Raspberry Awards, Worst Picture, Worst Director (Fred Durst), and Worst Actor which John Travolta won (also for his performance in Trading Paint).

References

External links
 
 
 

2019 films
2019 horror thriller films
2019 psychological thriller films
American horror thriller films
American psychological thriller films
2010s English-language films
Films about autism
Films about fandom
Films about stalking
Films directed by Fred Durst
Films scored by John Swihart
Films set in Los Angeles
Films shot in Alabama
Films shot in Los Angeles
Golden Raspberry Award winning films
Quiver Distribution films
2010s American films